Inkosa is a genus of beetles in the family Carabidae, containing the following species:

 Inkosa latiuscula Peringuey, 1926
 Inkosa minor Straneo, 1995

References

Pterostichinae